Sir Edward Stopford  (28 September 1766  – 14 September 1837) was an Anglo-Irish soldier and politician.

Early life
Edward Stopford was born on 28 September 1766. He was the second son of James Stopford, 2nd Earl of Courtown, and his wife Mary (née Powys). James Stopford, 3rd Earl of Courtown, was his elder brother and Sir Robert Stopford his younger brother.

Career
He served in the British Army and achieved the rank of Lieutenant-General. In 1810, he succeeded his elder brother as member of parliament for Marlborough, a seat he held until 1818. He was honoured when he was made a Knight Grand Cross of the Order of the Bath and Colonel of the 41st Regiment of Foot from 1819 to his death.

Personal life
He never married, but he had an affair with a French actress, Mademoiselle Anaïs, with whom he had a son, Edward Stopford Claremont, who also became a British Army general.

Death
He died on 14 September 1837, aged 70.

References

External links
 

|-

1766 births
1837 deaths
Members of the Parliament of the United Kingdom for English constituencies
UK MPs 1807–1812
UK MPs 1812–1818
Younger sons of earls
British Army generals
Knights Grand Cross of the Order of the Bath
Edward
British Army personnel of the Napoleonic Wars